Didier Henriette (born 6 December 1985 in Saint-Denis, Réunion) is a French professional racing cyclist who was active as an elite track cyclist between 2003 and 2008. In 2007 and 2008, he competed as part of the French Cofidis sprint cycling team in the UEC European Track Championships (U23 & Junior) and the Los Angeles Team Sprint Competition.

Career highlights

 2003: 1st in National Championship, Track, 1 km, Juniors, France (FRA)
 2003: 2nd in National Championship, Track, Sprint, Juniors, France (FRA)
 2003: 2nd in World Championship, Track, 1 km, Juniors, Moscou
 2004: 3rd in National Championship, Track, 1 km, U23, France (FRA)
 2005: 3rd in National Championship, Track, 1 km, U23, France (FRA)
 2005: 3rd in National Championship, Track, Sprint, U23, France (FRA)
 2005: 3rd in Los Angeles, Team Sprint (USA)
 2005: 2nd in European Championship, Track, Keirin, U23, Fiorenzuola
 2006: 2nd in European Championship, Track, Team Sprint, U23, Athens
 2006: 3rd in National Championship, Track, Team Sprint, Elite, France, Hyères (FRA)
 2006: 2nd in National Championship, Track, Sprint, U23, France, Hyères (FRA)
 2007: 1st in European Championship, Track, 1 km, U23, Cottbus (GER)
 2007: 1st in European Championship, Track, Team Sprint, U23, Cottbus (GER)
 2007: 2nd in National Championship, Track, Keirin, Elite, France (FRA)
 2007: 2nd in National Championship, Track, Team Sprint, Elite, France (FRA)
 2007: 2nd in National Championship, Track, 1 km, Elite, France, Hyères (FRA)
 2007: 1st in Aigle, Sprint (SUI)
 2007: 3rd in Sydney, Team Sprint (AUS)
 2008: 1st in Los Angeles, Team Sprint (USA)

References

External links

1985 births
Living people
French male cyclists
French track cyclists
Cyclists from Réunion